Quay of Blondes (French: Quai des blondes) is a 1954 French crime film directed by Paul Cadéac and starring Michel Auclair, Barbara Laage and Madeleine Lebeau. It was produced and distributed by Pathé and shot in Gevacolor. The film's sets were designed by the art director Lucien Carré. Location shooting took place in French Algeria and Marseille.

Synopsis
A former navy officer is tied up in a smuggling operation between Marseille and Tangier concentrating particularly in lucrative American cigarettes. However his position is threatened by the arrival of a thuggish American gangster who wants to take over the whole market.

Cast
 Michel Auclair as Jacques Fenner
 Barbara Laage as 	Barbara
 Madeleine Lebeau as 	Nelly
 Darío Moreno as 	Lucky
 John Kitzmiller as Michel
 Henri Arius as Le capitaine de 'L'Atlanta'
 Maurice Biraud as Laurent
 Paul Bisciglia as Le chasseur de l'hôtel
 René Blancard as 	Commissaire Brochant
 Georges Chamarat as 	Maître Chanu
 Paul Demange as Un client
 Jacques Dynam as Dominique
 Giani Esposito as Un tueur
 Micheline Gary as La secrétaire
 Robert Hossein as Chemise rose
 André Valmy as Marco

References

Bibliography 
Kermabon, Jacques. Pathé: premier empire du cinéma. Centre Georges Pompidou, 1994.

External links 
 

1954 films
French crime films
1954 crime films
1950s French-language films
Films set in Marseille
Films set in Tangier
Films shot in Algeria
Pathé films
Films with screenplays by Michel Audiard
1950s French films